Tel Nof Israeli Air Force , also known as Air Force Base 8, is one of three principal airbases of the Israeli Air Force. It is located near Rehovot, Israel.

Tel Nof houses several fighter, helicopter, and airlift squadrons. Also located at the base are several special units of the Israel Defense Forces, including Unit 669 (airborne combat search and rescue) and the paratroopers training center.

History
Tel Nof was founded in July 1939 during the British Mandate as RAF Aqir and served as the main Royal Air Force station in Palestine. From the 1948 Arab-Israeli War until 1950, it was known as Ekron Airfield.
 
The base housed the IAF flight academy until April 1966 when it was moved to Hatzerim Airbase.

On 18 October 2011, Gilad Shalit, an Israeli soldier who had been held captive by Hamas in Gaza for over five years and four months, returned to Israel via Tel Nof as part of a deal to exchange Shalit for 1,027 prisoners.

Nuclear weapons
Tel Nof airbase is located a few miles from the Sdot Micha Airbase complex, where nuclear weapons for its missions are reportedly stored. Just to the south of the Zachariah Jericho 2 training pad are several hardened bunkers that house nuclear gravity bombs for aircraft at the Tel Nof airbase a few kilometers to the northwest (see Nuclear weapons and Israel).

Units
106th Squadron - operating F-15C/D
114th Squadron - operating CH-53
118th Squadron - operating CH-53
133rd Squadron - operating F-15C/D
 210th Squadron - operating IAI Eitan UAVs
Flight Test Center
Unit 669, airborne combat search and rescue.
Paratrooper Training Center

RAF Aqir Operational units

Operational units of the Royal Air Force stationed at RAF Aqir from 1941 to 1948.
No. 6 Squadron RAF (1941) Westland Lysander
No. 10 Squadron RAF detachment (1942) Handley Page Halifax
No. 11 Squadron RAF (1941) Bristol Blenheim IV
No. 32 Squadron RAF (1946) Supermarine Spitfire IX
No. 37 Squadron RAF (1945) Consolidated Liberator VI
No. 45 Squadron RAF (1941) Bristol Blenheim IV
No. 55 Squadron RAF (1941) Bristol Blenheim IV
No. 70 Squadron RAF (1945) Consolidated Liberator VI
No. 76 Operational Training Unit RAF Vickers Wellington - Formed at RAF Aqir on 1 October 1943, equipped with Vickers Wellington Mk.IIIs and Xs to train night bomber crews for squadrons in the Middle East, disbanding on 30 July 1945. 76 OTU, despite operating Wellingtons, were also working up crews for B-24 Liberators.  After completion of their course those crews were passed on to Liberator conversion units. 
No. 80 Squadron RAF (1941) Hawker Hurricane I
No. 84 Squadron RAF (1941) Bristol Blenheim IV
No. 113 Squadron RAF (1946–1947) Handley Page Halifax
No. 159 Squadron RAF (1942) Consolidated Liberator II
No. 160 Squadron RAF (1942) Consolidated Liberator II
No. 162 Squadron RAF (1942) Vickers Wellington later Bristol Blenheim IV
No. 208 Squadron RAF (1941) Hawker Audax and (1946) Supermarine Spitfire VIII
No. 211 Squadron RAF (1941) Bristol Blenheim IV
No. 215 Squadron RAF (1947) Douglas Dakota
No. 221 Squadron RAF detachment (1945) Vickers Wellington XII
No. 227 Squadron RAF (1942) Handley Page Halifax
No. 250 Squadron RAF (1941) Curtiss Tomhawk IIB
No. 294 Squadron RAF detachment (1944) Vickers Wellington IC
No. 335 Squadron RAF (1941) Hawker Hurricane I
No. 450 Squadron RAAF (1941) Hawker Hurricane I
No. 620 Squadron RAF (1946) Douglas Dakota and Handley Page Halifax
No. 621 Squadron RAF (1946) Avro Lancaster ASRIII
No. 680 Squadron RAF detachment (1945) Fairchild Argus

See also
List of Royal Air Force stations
List of former Royal Air Force stations

References

Bibliography

Further reading
 Jefford, C.G. RAF Squadrons, a Comprehensive Record of the Movement and Equipment of all RAF Squadrons and their Antecedents since 1912. Shrewsbury, Shropshire, UK: Airlife Publishing, 2001. .
 Sturtivant, Ray, ISO and John Hamlin. RAF Flying Training And Support Units since 1912. Tonbridge, Kent, UK: Air-Britain (Historians) Ltd., 2007. .

External links

Tel Nof from globalsecurity.org
Aeroflight World Airforces
The RAF in Palestine 

Israeli Air Force bases
Buildings and structures in Rehovot
RAF Aqir